Angèle Ntyugwetondo Rawiri (29 April 1954 – 15 November 2010) was the first Gabonese novelist.

A daughter of Galoa politician and poet Georges Rawiri, she was born at Port-Gentil. Her mother, a teacher, died when she was six. Angèle studied at Alès in France, earned a bac from the Vanves girls' college, then a second bac, in English translation, from the Institute Lentonnet. She then lived in London for two years, where she played small roles in James Bond films and modelled for fashion magazines.

She returned to Gabon in 1979, working as a translator and interpreter, and writing her first novel, G'amarakano. The story of the clash between a young girl's desire for material goods and the older generation's traditional values, it was published in 1983. Her second novel, Elonga (1986) was about a young metis' encounter with fetishism upon his return to his mother's country. Fureur et cris et femmes appeared in 1989.

She published her first works under the name Ntyugwetondo Rawiri.

Published works
Elonga: roman Paris: Silex: L’Harmattan, diffusion, c1986. 
Gʾamèrakano: au carrefour: roman Paris: Silex, c1988. 
Fureurs et cris de femme Paris: L’Harmattan, c1989.

References

 David E. Gardinier, Historical Dictionary of Gabon, 2nd ed. (The Scarecrow Press, 1994) p. 287

External links
 UWA page with novel synopses

1954 births
2010 deaths
Gabonese women writers
Gabonese novelists
People from Ogooué-Maritime Province
20th-century novelists
20th-century women writers
21st-century Gabonese people